The Association of Communist Workers was an anti-revisionist political party in the United Kingdom.

It originated in 1969 as a split from the Revolutionary Marxist-Leninist League around Harpal Brar.  Initially regarded as Maoist, it spent time working in the women's movement through its "Union of Women for Liberation".  Through Brar, the group was closely linked with the Indian Workers Association, the Association of Indian Communists and the Stalin Society.

The group increasingly moved from Maoism to anti-revisionism, and in 1997 they officially dissolved the ACW and joined the Socialist Labour Party (SLP).  When many of them left the SLP in 2004, they founded the Communist Party of Great Britain (Marxist-Leninist).

See also
 Communist Workers League of Britain (Marxist–Leninist)

References
Peter Barberis, John McHugh and Mike Tyldesley, Encyclopedia of British and Irish Political Organizations

Anti-revisionist organizations
Defunct communist parties in the United Kingdom
Political parties established in 1969
Defunct Maoist parties
Maoist organisations in the United Kingdom
Political parties disestablished in 1997